The Men's 85 kilograms weightlifting event at the 2012 Summer Olympics in London, United Kingdom, took place at ExCeL London.

Summary
Total score was the sum of the lifter's best result in each of the snatch and the clean and jerk, with three lifts allowed for each lift.  In case of a tie, the lighter lifter won; if still tied, the lifter who took the fewest attempts to achieve the total score won.  Lifters without a valid snatch score did not perform the clean and jerk.

In June 2016, following the Russian doping scandal, it was announced by IWF that retests of the samples taken from the 2012 Olympics indicated that silver medalist Apti Aukhadov had tested positive for prohibited substances (dehydrochloromethyltestosterone and drostanolone). It was confirmed that Aukhadov was stripped of his medal by the IOC on 18 October 2016

Schedule
All times are British Summer Time (UTC+01:00)

Records

 Andrei Rybakou's world and Olympic records were rescinded in 2016.

Results

 Apti Aukhadov of Russia originally finished second, but was disqualified after he tested positive for dehydrochloromethyltestosterone and drostanolone.
 Mikalai Novikau of Belarus originally finished eighth, but was disqualified after he tested positive for dehydrochloromethyltestosterone and stanozolol.
 Rauli Tsirekidze of Georgia originally finished ninth, but was disqualified after he tested positive for dehydrochloromethyltestosterone and stanozolol.
 Gabriel Sîncrăian of Romania, who failed to achieve a total, was disqualified after he tested positive for Exogenous Anabolic Androgenic Steroids.

References 

Results 

Weightlifting at the 2012 Summer Olympics
Men's events at the 2012 Summer Olympics